The Hungry Hollow Formation is a geologic formation in Ontario. It preserves fossils dating back to the Devonian period. Remains of the Devonian polychaete Arkonips are known from this formation.

See also

 List of fossiliferous stratigraphic units in Ontario

References

 

Devonian Ontario
Devonian southern paleotemperate deposits